The 2008 Jordan Rally was the fifth round of 2008 World Rally Championship season and the third gravel round of the championship and also the second round of the Junior World Rally Championship. The event began with a ceremonial start on Thursday, April 24 in Amman, Jordan, near the Dead Sea.

Results

Special stages
All dates and times are EEST (UTC+3).

References

External links 
 Results at official page WRC.com

Jordan Rally, 2008
2008 in Jordanian sport